Hypochrysops narcissus, the Narcissus jewel, is a member of the family Lycaenidae of butterflies.

References

Luciini
Butterflies described in 1775
Taxa named by Johan Christian Fabricius